Gianni Dean Lombard (born 22 January 1998) is a South African rugby union player for the  in the Currie Cup and the  in the Rugby Challenge. His regular position is Fly-half or fullback.

References

South African rugby union players
Living people
1998 births
People from Worcester, South Africa
Rugby union fly-halves
Rugby union wings
Rugby union fullbacks
Golden Lions players
South Africa Under-20 international rugby union players
Lions (United Rugby Championship) players
NTT DoCoMo Red Hurricanes Osaka players
Rugby union players from the Western Cape